McCaw is a surname. Notable people with the surname include:

 Bill McCaw (born 1927), New Zealand rugby player
 Chris McCaw (born 1971), American photographer
 Craig McCaw (born 1949), American businessman, ex-husband of Wendy McCaw
 J. Elroy McCaw (1911-1969), American businessman
 John McCaw (1918-2015), british clarinetist born in New Zealand
 John McCaw Jr. (born ), American businessman
 Kenneth McCaw (1907–1989), Australian politician
 Patrick McCaw (born 1995), American basketball player
 Richie McCaw (born 1980), New Zealand rugby player
 Sean (Allen) McCaw (born 1973), American basketball player
 Susan McCaw (born 1962), American politician, ambassador to Austria; current wife of Craig McCaw
 Wendy McCaw (born 1951), American journalist and owner of the Santa Barbara News-Press; ex-wife of Craig McCaw

See also
 McCaw Hall, opera house in Seattle, named after the mother of donor Craig McCaw
 McCaw Cellular, former telecommunication company founded by Craig McCaw